Jermaine McSporran (born 1 January 1977, Manchester, England) is a retired footballer who last played for Oxford City in the Southern League Division One South and West, after having been released by Chester City and Banbury United in the summer of 2006.

He was signed by Chester City from Doncaster Rovers (where he scored two goals, one against Ipswich in the League Cup and one in the league against Oldham) in 2006 and has also played for Wycombe Wanderers. In March 2004 he moved to Walsall. He joined Boston United in February 2006, and also played for Abingdon United.

He works full-time in a Unipart distribution warehouse in Oxford.

References

External links

1977 births
Living people
Wycombe Wanderers F.C. players
Walsall F.C. players
Doncaster Rovers F.C. players
Boston United F.C. players
Chester City F.C. players
Oxford City F.C. players
English Football League players
Abingdon Town F.C. players
Abingdon United F.C. players
Kidlington F.C. players
Association football midfielders
English footballers